The ninth season of the French version of Dancing with the Stars  started in October 2018 on TF1. It was hosted by Camille Combal and Karine Ferri. Nico Archambault did not reprise his role as judge and was replaced by Patrick Dupond. Fauve Hautot also left the panel of the judges to return as a dancer and was replaced by the winner of Danse avec les stars (France season 2), Shy'm. Jean-Marc Généreux and Chris Marques both returned as judges.

Participants

Scoring 

Red numbers indicate the couples with the lowest score for each week.
Blue numbers indicate the couples with the highest score for each week.
 indicates the couples eliminated that week.
 indicates the returning couple that finished in the bottom two.
 indicates the winning couple.
 indicates the runner-up couple.
 indicates the third place couple.

Averages 
This table only counts dances scored on the traditional 40-point scale.

Highest and lowest scoring performances
The best and worst performances in each dance according to the judges' marks:

Couples' highest and lowest scoring performances
According to the traditional 40-point scale: (points on a 30-point scale are recalculated on a 40-point scale)

Styles, scores and songs

Week 1 

 Individual judges' scores in the chart below (given in parentheses) are listed in this order from left to right: Patrick Dupond, Shy'm, Chris Marques, Jean-Marc Généreux.

Running order

Week 2: The Judges' challenge 

 Individual judges' scores in the chart below (given in parentheses) are listed in this order from left to right: Patrick Dupond, Shy'm, Chris Marques, Jean-Marc Généreux.

Running order

Week 3: Love Night 

 Individual judges' scores in the chart below (given in parentheses) are listed in this order from left to right: Patrick Dupond, Shy'm, Chris Marques, Jean-Marc Généreux.

Running order

Week 4 

 Individual judges' scores in the chart below (given in parentheses) are listed in this order from left to right: Patrick Dupond, Shy'm, Chris Marques, Jean-Marc Généreux.

Running order

Week 5: Halloween 

 Individual judges' scores in the chart below (given in parentheses) are listed in this order from left to right: Patrick Dupond, Shy'm, Chris Marques, Jean-Marc Généreux.

Running order

Week 6: Welcome Home 

 Individual judges' scores in the chart below (given in parentheses) are listed in this order from left to right: Patrick Dupond, Shy'm, Chris Marques, Jean-Marc Généreux.

Running order

Week 7: Michael Jackson Night 

 Individual judges' scores in the chart below (given in parentheses) are listed in this order from left to right: Patrick Dupond, Shy'm, Chris Marques, Jean-Marc Généreux.

Running order

Week 8: Coach's Night 

 Individual judges' scores in the chart below (given in parentheses) are listed in this order from left to right: Patrick Dupond, Shy'm, Chris Marques, Jean-Marc Généreux.

Running order

Week 9: Michel Sardou Night 

 Individual judges' scores in the chart below (given in parentheses) are listed in this order from left to right: Patrick Dupond, Shy'm, Jean-Marc Généreux, Chris Marques.

Week 10: Final Night 

 Individual judges' scores in the chart below (given in parentheses) are listed in this order from left to right: Patrick Dupond, Shy'm, Jean-Marc Généreux, Chris Marques.

Musical Guests

References

Season 09
2018 French television seasons